Susanna Cenni (born 17 April 1963) is an Italian politician of the Democratic Party.

Biography 
Cenni began her political career when she was very young, joining the Italian Communist Party, which later became Democratic Party of the Left and then Democrats of the Left. In 2007, Cenni was elected in the National Constituent of the Democratic Party.

From 2000 to 2005, Cenni has been the regional councilor for Tourism, Trade and Fairs in Tuscany, while from 2005 to 2008, she has been the regional councilor for Agriculture, both times under Claudio Martini's presidency.

Cenni is elected for the first time to the Chamber of Deputies after the 2008 general elections, and has been later re-elected in the 2013 elections and the 2018 elections. Cenni is currently vice-president of the Agriculture Committee of the Chamber of Deputies.

In occasion of the 2017 Democratic Party primaries, she gave her support to Minister of Justice Andrea Orlando.

References

External links 
Files about her parliamentary activities (in Italian): XVI, XVII, XVIII legislature.

1963 births
Living people
Democratic Party (Italy) politicians
Deputies of Legislature XVI of Italy
Deputies of Legislature XVII of Italy
Deputies of Legislature XVIII of Italy
Politicians of Tuscany
21st-century Italian politicians
People from the Province of Siena